Karassik is a Russian or Ukrainian last name Карасик and may refer to:

Igor Karassik (1911–1995), Russian-American engineer
Youli Karassik (1923–2005), Soviet and Russian director and screenwriter

See also
Paul Karasik (born 1956), American cartoonist, editor, and teacher